The Bagobo language can refer to either of the following Austronesian languages spoken in Mindanao, Philippines:

Giangan language, also referred to as Bagobo
Tagabawa language, also referred to as Bagobo